Mayo or Mayo Abbey is a village in County Mayo, Ireland.  Although it bears the same name as the county, it is not the county seat, which is Castlebar. Mayo Abbey is a small historic village in south Mayo approximately 16 km to the south of Castlebar and 10 km north west of Claremorris.

History
The village was an important centre in the Gaelic and Anglo-Saxon Christian world in the seventh and eighth centuries. St. Colmán, Bishop of Lindisfarne, founded a monastery here for a group of Saxon monks, called the School of Mayo. Saint Gerald became its first abbot in 670. Danish raiders attacked the monastery in 783 and again in 805. Finally Turgesius completely destroyed it in 818 
 
The village was the centre of the diocese of Mayo from 1152. It was suppressed in the thirteenth century. Bishops were appointed, however, as late as
the sixteenth century. One of its bishops, Patrick O'Hely, who died in 1589, is numbered among the Irish martyr saints. The diocese was formally joined to Tuam by papal decree in 1631.

Culture
The BBC four-part documentary Amongst Women was filmed in Mayo Abbey using the Old Catholic Church, the graveyard and the post office/shop.

Sport
Mayo Gaels is the local Gaelic football team. They compete at all underage levels as well as senior and junior football.

Annalistic references

 726 - Gerald, of Magh Eo, died on the 13th of March.
 726 - Muireadhach, son of Indreachtach, was slain; he was Bishop of Magh Eo.
 905 - The oratory of Magh-eo was burned.
 M1209.1. Kele O'Duffy, Bishop of Mayo of the Saxons ... died.
 M1478.1. The Bishop O'Higgin, i.e. Bishop of Mayo-na-Saxon, died.

See also
 List of towns and villages in Ireland
 List of abbeys and priories in Ireland (County Mayo)

References

External links
 HistoryIreland.com - Maigh Eo na Sacsan

Towns and villages in County Mayo
Christian monasteries in the Republic of Ireland